Omphiscola is a genus of small to medium-sized, air-breathing, freshwater snails, aquatic pulmonate gastropod mollusks in the family Lymnaeidae.

Distribution
This is a European genus.

Species
Species within the genus include:
 Omphiscola glabra (Müller, 1774) - type species
 Omphiscola reticulata (Gassies, 1867)

References

Lymnaeidae
Taxa named by Constantine Samuel Rafinesque